The Likouala-aux-Herbes is a river in the Republic of the Congo.
It is a tributary of the Sangha River, which in turn is a tributary of the Congo River.
It gives its name to the Likouala Department.

Location

The lower Sangha, the Likouala-aux-Herbes and Likouala-Mossaka rivers flow through the Congolese Cuvette, a huge depression.
The soil of this region is sand or clay Quaternary fluvial alluvia.
The Likouala aux Herbes basin is located on the predominantly sandy Quaternary formations of the Congolese basin.

The course of the Likouala meanders and shifts over time.
The coefficient of sinuosity is more than 1.5 in the upper section, around 2.0 in the middle section and in the lower section as high as 2.8.
The lower sections of the Sangha and Likouala-aux-Herbes flow through flat land with little difference in elevation between the two rivers.
Part of the lower section of the Sangha River divides into two meandering channels, which then recombine.
Further down, a "canal" connects the Sangha and Likouala-aux-Herbes some distance above the main confluence of the two rivers.

Hydrology

The basin above this point covered .

Ecology

The Congolese Cuvette has an equatorial climate.
The waters of the Likouala-aux-Herbes are reddish brown and contain high quantities of humic and fulvic acids.
Vegetation in the river basin is dense, humid, shady forest that partly floods during the high water season.
The forest around the upper portion opens into a broad grassy plain near Epena, which increases in width further downstream, although in some parts the forest closes in on the river.
In the rainy season the river flows over its banks, and it is often practical for a canoe to take a shortcut between two meanders.
The river's name, which means "grassy river", derives from the fact that most of its alluvial plain is flooded grassland, dominated by Jardinea congoensis on the flooded banks, and Hyparrhenia diplandra on the drier banks.

People

Epena, on the river bank just east of the Lake Télé Community Reserve, is the headquarters of Epena District.
It was extremely isolated until 1989, when a paved road from the regional capital Impfondo was opened.
In and above Itanga the people speak dialects of the Bomitaba language.
Below Epena the Babole people speak dialects of the Dibole language.
The local people engage in fishing and in subsistence agriculture on areas of drier ground.

Lake Télé Community Reserve

The Lake Télé Community Reserve covers a large area adjoining the right (west) bank of the upper Likouala-aux-Herbes to the east of Epena.
It is a wetland ecosystem, part of the Complexe Transfrontalier Lac Télé - Grands Affluents - Lac Tumba, a transboundary Ramsar site established in June 2017.
It includes swamp forest, flooded and wooded savanna and floating prairie.
Lac Télé has turbid water with much organic matter, but the rivers are rich in fish. 
Resident birds include African darters (Anhinga rufa).
Mammals include western lowland gorillas, chimpanzees, elephants, buffaloes, duikers and hippopotamuses.
In 2008 researchers from the Wildlife Conservation Society counted gorilla nests and estimated about 125,000 gorillas were living there, far more than the worldwide total thought to be alive at that time.

Notes

Citations

Sources

Rivers of the Republic of the Congo